The surname Keigwin (from Cornish, meaning "White dog" from the word "Kei" – a dog, and "gwyn" – white: and thus figuratively, a hero) might refer to:

Herbert Keigwin – English cricketer
Henry Keigwin – English cricketer

External links
Last Names website